The 2006–07 KNVB Cup was the 89th edition of the tournament. The competition started on 26 August 2006 and the final was held on 6 May 2007 at the Feyenoord Stadion in Rotterdam. The match between defending Cup winners Ajax and 3-time winners AZ finished 1–1 after regular time and after extra time. Ajax went on to win 8–7 on penalties and received the cup for the seventeenth time.

Teams
 All 18 participants from the Eredivisie 2006-07
 All 20 participants from the Eerste Divisie 2006-07
 Two youth teams
 48 teams from lower (amateur) leagues, only these teams entered in the first round

First round
Only amateur clubs from the hoofdklasse and below participated in this round.

Second round
The professional clubs from the Eredivisie and Eerste Divisie and the two youth teams entered the tournament this round.

E Eredivisie; 1 Eerste Divisie; A Amateur teams

Third round

From round of 16 to final

Final 

Ajax and AZ already secured a spot in the Champions League play-offs of the national competition, with a place in the UEFA Cup being the minimal prize.  Therefore, the UEFA Cup ticket the winner of this tournament would win, could now be won in the Eredivisie play-offs.

See also
 Eredivisie 2006-07
 Eerste Divisie 2006-07

External links
 Results by Ronald Zwiers  

2006-07
2006–07 domestic association football cups
2006–07 in Dutch football